Tacticus may refer to:

People
 Aeneas Tacticus, a 4th century BC Greek writer on the art of war
 Aelianus Tacticus, a 2nd century AD Greek military writer
 Asclepiodotus Tacticus, a 1st century BC Greek philosopher

Other uses
 General Tacticus, a fictional Discworld character

See also 
 
 Tacitus (disambiguation)